Makaota is a community council located in the Mafeteng District of Lesotho. Its population in 2006 was 31,014.

Villages
The community of Makaota includes the villages of Borokhong, Ha 'Mei, Ha Kotoanyane, Ha Kuebu, Ha Lebenkele, Ha Matsepe, Ha Mofalali, Ha Mothokho, Ha Motlere, Ha Mphatšoane, Ha Mpholle, Ha Nthebe, Ha Ramokhele, Ha Ramokhele (Koeneng), Ha Ramokoena, Ha Ranteme, Ha Seitlheko, Ha Souru, Ha Tšele, Ha Tseleng, Hospital Area, Khalahali, Khubetsoana, Lecop, Leloaleng, Lifelekoaneng, Likoung, Machoaboleng, Matheneng, Matholeng, Matlapaneng, Matsatseng, Motse-Mocha (Ha Matsepe), Paballong, Phahameng, Ramatlepe, Sekantšing (Ha Lekhari), Thabaneng, Tjorosing and Wepener Road.

References

External links
 Google map of community villages

Populated places in Mafeteng District